Malagarasi Hydroelectric Power Station, is a planned  hydroelectric power station in Tanzania. The development is planned in the Igamba area, west of the Malagarasi swamps, at the site of the Igamba Falls.

Location
The power station would be located on the Malagarasi River, west of the Malagarasi swamps, in the area called Igamba. This location is the location of the Igamba Falls, where the power station would be located.

Overview
Malagarasi Hydropower Station is intended to add 50 megawatts to the Tanzanian national electricity grid and to supply sustainable, renewable, green energy to the city of Kigoma and surrounding communities, including Uvinza, Kasulu and Buhigwe, which obtain their electricity from diesel sources. Any surplus electricity from this power station will be integrated into the national grid at an electric substation at Kidahwe, a suburb of Kigoma. A new  132kV high voltage power line from the new power station to the substation at Kidahwe, is a component of this project.

According to the African Development Bank, the project has these additional benefits: 1. It will create approximately 700 jobs during the construction phase 2. It will reduce production costs of electricity in the Kigoma Region from US$0.33 to about US$0.04 per kilowatt-hour 3. It will reduce the use of fossil fuels and the attendant emission of greenhouse gases and 4. The cost of doing business is expected “to reduce because the industry will no longer need to maintain expensive back-up generators”.

Construction costs and funding sources
As of November 2020, the total construction budget was US$144.14 million. The table below illustrates the sources of funding for the project. The loan documents were executed between the AfDB and the government of Tanzania, on 28 May 2021.

Technical consultant
Tanesco selected the Italian consulting engineering firm Studio Pietrangeli to oversee and supervise the technical aspects of the project, including review of the ESIA document, design of dam and powerhouse, design and supervision of tenders.

See also

Tanzania Power Stations
Africa Dams

References

External links
 Approximate Location of Malagarasi Hydroelectric Power Station

Hydroelectric power stations in Tanzania
Proposed renewable energy power stations in Tanzania
Kigoma Region
Energy infrastructure in Tanzania
Proposed hydroelectric power stations